Shivaraj Tangadagi is an Indian Politician from the state of Karnataka. He was a member of the Karnataka Legislative Assembly representing the Kanakagiri constituency between 2013 and 2018.

Political party
Tangadagi is a member of the Indian National Congress.

Ministry
Tangadagi was the Minister for Minor Irrigation in the Siddaramaiah-led Karnataka Government.

Controversy
It was alleged that his supporters were involved in a killing of a 17-year-old student from his constituency.

External links 
 Karnataka Legislative Assembly

References 

µ
Living people
Karnataka MLAs 2008–2013
Indian National Congress politicians from Karnataka
Karnataka MLAs 2013–2018
Year of birth missing (living people)